The Serbian Autonomous Oblast of Bosanska Krajina was a self-proclaimed Serbian Autonomous Oblast within today's Bosnia and Herzegovina. It was sometimes called the Autonomous Oblast of Krajina, or the Autonomous Region of Krajina (ARK). SAO Bosanska Krajina was located in the geographical region named Bosanska Krajina. Its capital was Banja Luka. The region was subsequently included into Republika Srpska.

History

The SAO Bosanska Krajina developed in summer and autumn of 1991 in preparation for a step to independence being taken by Bosnia like Slovenia and Croatia had done. The goal was to have areas where Serbs had a majority or a significant portion of population prevent such independence. The Serbs for this created three Serbian autonomous districts and one Serbian autonomous region (SAO Bosanska Krajina being the region).

The SAO Bosanska Krajina was created from the Community (Association) of Bosanska Krajina Municipalities, with the exception that it did not include the region known as Cazinska Krajina or Prijedor municipality at first. Other similar situations were done in other Associations of Municipalities (or Community of Municipalities) in Bosnia, which were a type of government created under the Constitution of the Socialist Federal Republic of Yugoslavia.

On or about 16 September 1991, the Association of Bosanska Krajina Municipalities was transformed into the Autonomous Region of Krajina (ARK), which came to include (amongst others) the following municipalities: Banja Luka, Bihać-Ripač, Bosanska Dubica, Bosanska Gradiška, Bosanska Krupa, Bosanski Novi, Bosanski Petrovac, Čelinac, Donji Vakuf, Ključ, Kotor Varoš, Prijedor, Prnjavor, Sanski Most, Šipovo and Teslić. A separate Assembly of the Serbian People in Bosnia and Herzegovina was established on 24 October 1991, dominated by the Serbian Democratic Party (SDS). On 9 January 1992, that Assembly adopted a declaration on the proclamation of the Serbian Republic of Bosnia and Herzegovina. The geographical area comprising the ARK thus became part of the proclaimed Serbian Republic of Bosnia and Herzegovina.

Unlike the other SAOs in Bosnia which were formed over summer and fall, the SAO Bosanska Krajina was officially formed on April 25, 1991, but under the name ARK (Autonomous Region of Krajina — referring to Bosanska Krajina). There were attempts during the summer of 1991 to merge it with SAO Krajina. On September 12 its name was officially changed to SAO Bosanska Krajina.

See also
SAO Romanija
SAO North-Eastern Bosnia
SAO Eastern Herzegovina

References

States and territories disestablished in 1992
States and territories established in 1991
History of Republika Srpska
Separatism in Bosnia and Herzegovina
History of Bosanska Krajina